Access is the first extended play by South Korean girl group Acid Angel from Asia, a sub-unit of TripleS consisting of members Jeong Hye-rin, Kim Yoo-yeon, Kim Na-kyoung, and Gong Yu-bin. It was released on October 28, 2022, by Modhaus and distributed by Kakao Entertainment. The album contains five tracks, including the title track "Generation".

Promotion and release
On September 16, it was announced that tripleS would begin preparing for sub-unit debut activities with each unit having 4 members. The two sub-units were named Acid Angel From Asia and +(KR)ystal Eyes, with Acid Angel From Asia having their debut activities first in October. The lineup was voted by fans and Acid Angel From Asia made their official debut with the first extended play Access on October 28, 2022.

Track listing

Charts

Weekly charts

Monthly charts

Release history

References

TripleS (group) albums
2022 debut EPs
Korean-language EPs
Kakao M EPs